Mattia Preti (24 February 1613 – 3 January 1699) was an Italian Baroque artist who worked in Italy and Malta. He was appointed a Member of the Order of Saint John.

Life

Born in the small town of Taverna in Calabria, Preti was called Il Cavalier Calabrese (the Calabrian Knight) after appointment as a Knight of the Order of St. John (Knights of Malta) in 1660. His early apprenticeship is said to have been with the "Caravaggist" Giovanni Battista Caracciolo, which may account for his lifelong interest in the style of Caravaggio.

Probably before 1630, Preti joined his brother Gregorio (also a painter), in Rome, where he became familiar with the techniques of Caravaggio and his school as well as with the work of Guercino, Rubens, Guido Reni, and Giovanni Lanfranco. In Rome, he painted fresco cycles in the churches of Sant'Andrea della Valle and San Carlo ai Catinari. Between 1644 and 1646, he may have spent time in Venice, but remained based in Rome until 1653, returning later in 1660–61. He painted frescoes for the church of San Biagio at Modena (app. 1651–2) and participated in the fresco decoration of the Palazzo Pamphilj in Valmontone (documented 1660–61), where he worked along with Pier Francesco Mola, Gaspar Dughet, Francesco Cozza, Giovanni Battista Tassi (il Cortonese), and Guglielmo Cortese.

During most of 1653–1660, he worked in Naples, starting with a Saint Nicholas. There he was influenced by another prominent painter of his era, Luca Giordano. Preti's major works include a series of large fresco ex-votos depicting the Virgin or saints delivering people from the plague, which were painted on seven city gates and are now lost - two sketches for them are in the Capodimonte Museum in Naples,  including a bozzetto of the Virgin with the baby Jesus looming over the dying and their burial parties which envisions a Last Judgement presided over by a woman. Preti also won a commission to supervise the construction, carving, and gilding for the nave and transept of San Pietro a Maiella, along with producing a Judith and Holofernes and Saint John the Baptist, both still in Naples.

Having been made a Knight of Grace in the Order of St John, he visited the order's headquarters in Malta in 1659 and spent most of the remainder of his life there. Preti transformed the interior of St. John's Co-Cathedral in Valletta with a huge series of paintings on the life and martyrdom of St. John the Baptist (1661–1666). In Malta one also can find many paintings of Preti in private collections and in parish churches. His increased reputation led to an expanded circle of patrons, and he received commissions from all over Europe.

Preti was fortunate to enjoy a long career and have a considerable artistic output. His paintings, representative of the exuberant late Baroque style, are held by many great museums, including important collections in Naples, Valletta, and in his hometown of Taverna, Calabria.

Gallery

References

Further reading

External links
 

1613 births
1699 deaths
People from the Province of Catanzaro
17th-century Italian painters
Italian male painters
Italian Baroque painters
Knights of Malta
Caravaggisti
Catholic painters